Steinauer, locally pronounced "Steener", is a village in Pawnee County, Nebraska, United States. The population was 59 at the 2020 census.

History
The first settlement at Steinauer was made in the 1850s by Joseph Steinauer and his two brothers, Anton and Nicholas, after they were forced to leave their native Switzerland due to famine and depression in 1852.

Steinauer was platted in 1886 when the railroad was extended to that point. It was named for Joseph A. Steinauer, an early settler and the first postmaster.

Geography
Steinauer is located at  (40.207966, -96.232547).

Demographics

2010 census
As of the census of 2010, there were 75 people, 34 households, and 19 families residing in the village. The racial makeup of the village was 98.7% White and 1.3% from two or more races.

There were 34 households, of which 17.6% had children under the age of 18 living with them, 52.9% were married couples living together, 2.9% had a male householder with no wife present, and 44.1% were non-families. 41.2% of all households were made up of individuals, and 20.6% had someone living alone who was 65 years of age or older. The average household size was 2.21 and the average family size was 3.11.

The median age in the village was 47.5 years. 16% of residents were under the age of 18; 10.7% were between the ages of 18 and 24; 21.3% were from 25 to 44; 22.7% were from 45 to 64; and 29.3% were 65 years of age or older. The gender makeup of the village was 45.3% male and 54.7% female.

2000 census
As of the census of 2000, there were 74 people, 37 households, and 21 families residing in the village. The population density was 546.1 people per square mile (204.1/km). There were 46 housing units at an average density of 339.5 per square mile (126.9/km). The racial makeup of the village was 100.00% White.

There were 37 households, out of which 21.6% had children under the age of 18 living with them, 51.4% were married couples living together, 2.7% had a female householder with no husband present, and 43.2% were non-families. 40.5% of all households were made up of individuals, and 16.2% had someone living alone who was 65 years of age or older. The average household size was 2.00 and the average family size was 2.71.

In the village, the population was spread out, with 20.3% under the age of 18, 4.1% from 18 to 24, 20.3% from 25 to 44, 35.1% from 45 to 64, and 20.3% who were 65 years of age or older. The median age was 48 years. For every 100 females, there were 100.0 males. For every 100 females age 18 and over, there were 103.4 males.

As of 2000 the median income for a household in the village was $27,500, and the median income for a family was $38,750. Males had a median income of $21,667 versus $18,125 for females. The per capita income for the village was $15,378. There were 8.7% of families and 4.9% of the population living below the poverty line, including no under eighteens and none of those over 64.

Education
Its school district is Humboldt Table Rock Steinauer Public Schools.

References

Villages in Pawnee County, Nebraska
Villages in Nebraska